Zelenyi Hai is a village in Beryslav Raion, Kherson Oblast, southern Ukraine. It belongs to the Kalynivske settlement hromada, one of the hromadas of Ukraine.

Administrative status 
Until 18 July, 2020, Zelenyi Hai belonged to Velyka Oleksandrivka Raion. The raion was abolished in July 2020 as part of the administrative reform of Ukraine, which reduced the number of raions of Kherson Oblast to five. The area of Velyka Oleksandrivka Raion was merged into Beryslav Raion.

References

Villages in Beryslav Raion